Come or Kome was an ancient town on the island of Tenos. It is mentioned in ancient inscriptions.

Its site is tentatively located on Tenos.

References

Populated places in the ancient Aegean islands
Former populated places in Greece
Tinos